The villa Sésini (often improperly spelt Susini) is a torture center established in El Biar during the Algerian war in the city of Algiers.

History
The villa was built in El Biar by Alexandre Sésini, notary at rue Bab Azzoun in Algiers.

In 1926, the city of Algiers classified it as a natural monument, in 1927, the German consulate moved there.

It was transformed into a detention and torture center during the Algerian Revolution.

It housed after independence for a time, the headquarters of the United Nations High Commissioner for Refugees (UNHCR).

After the independence of Algeria, the Villa Susini was used, in coordination with Cuba, for the military training of Latin American revolutionaries.

By decree of the Algerian Ministry of Culture dated 28 April 2016, the villa is classified on the list of protected cultural property.

Notable inmates
 Brahim Boushaki (1912-1997)
 Louisette Ighilahriz (born 1936)
 Mohamed Charef (1908-2011)
 Nassima Hablal (1928-2013)

Notable torturers

 Roger Trinquier
 
 Roger Faulques
 Wilhelmus Vaal
 Paul Aussaresses
 Jean Graziani
 Jacques Massu
 André Chabanne
 Henri Pouillot
 Yves Godard
 
 Marcel Bigeard
 Michel Fleutiaux
 Philippe Erulin
 André Charbonnier
 Jean-Marie Le Pen
 
 Maurice Schmitt
 Marcel Devis
 Albert Roux
 Charles Lacheroy

Gallery

See also

External links

Bibliography

References

Buildings and structures in Algiers Province
Algerian War
Prisons in Algeria
Torture in Algeria
Human rights abuses in France
Military scandals
Algerian war crimes
French war crimes